"What Cha' Gonna Do For Me" is the title track of Chaka Khan's third solo album from 1981. The song was written by Ned Doheny and Hamish Stuart of the Average White Band. They had recorded the song a year earlier and released it on their LP Shine.

The song was the second of four number-one singles on the R&B chart for Khan and was at the top spot for two weeks. The single was also her second entry on the Billboard Hot 100, reaching number 53.  On the Cash Box Top 100, "What Cha' Gonna Do For Me" reached number 49.

In New Zealand, the song peaked at #21.

Chart performance

Weekly charts

Year-end charts

Unreleased demo version 

A demo version of the song by Doheny was released by The Numero Group on April 19, 2014 alongside a reissue of "Get It Up For Love," due to Doheny's popularity in Japan. The demo was recorded in 1980 and was previously unreleased, with the Average White Band as the backing band.

References

External links
 
 

1981 singles
Chaka Khan songs
1980 songs
Post-disco songs
Songs written by Hamish Stuart
Average White Band songs